Phillip James Pettus is an American politician. He serves as a Republican member of the Alabama House of Representatives.

Education
Pettus attended Shelby State Community College and University of North Alabama.

Career
Pettus was first elected in 2014.

In 2017, Pettus announced that he would be running for the 2018–2022 term. He won with 62.6% of the vote in the general election.

Pettus opposed Senate Bill 171 designating the sweet potato as the official state vegetable of Alabama in a recorded vote on April 13, 2021.

Personal life
Pettus's wife is Mary. They have three children.

References

External links
 Phillip Pettus at Alabama House of Representative

Living people
People from Lauderdale County, Alabama
Republican Party members of the Alabama House of Representatives
21st-century American politicians
University of North Alabama alumni
1962 births